Shahrak-e Eslamabad (also Romanized as Shahrak-e Eslāmābād; also known as Benvār-e Nāz̧er and Bonvār Nāz̧er) is a village in Howmeh Rural District, in the Central District of Andimeshk County, Khuzestan Province, Iran. At the 2006 census, its population was 1,365, in 274 families.

References 

Populated places in Andimeshk County